Zimbabwe Open University (ZOU) is an open distance education university in Zimbabwe. Established in 1999, ZOU is the only distance education university in the country. Student enrollment at ZOU has been growing steadily from the time of its formation and in terms of enrollment it is the largest university in Zimbabwe. The Zimbabwe Open University has seven faculties under which the academic programmes are conducted.

History
After independence, the Government of Zimbabwe adopted a policy of education for all. To address the need for high skilled manpower the 5 Year National Development Plan (1991–1995) stated:

The University of Zimbabwe, which was the single university in the country at that time, could not cope with the demand for university education. Two commissions were established: the Williams Commission (1981) and the Zimbabwe Open University Feasibility Study (1986). In July 1994, a committee was formed to investigate the development of university distance education. The commission recommended that there is need for distance education at university level to upgrade skills and "to provide a continuing education facility for the adult population". Based on these recommendations the Centre for Distance Education (CDE) of the University of Zimbabwe was formed in 1993. In 1996, it became the University College of Distance Education (UCDE) and finally renamed to Zimbabwe Open University (ZOU) on March 1, 1999 by an Act of Parliament.  The first Vice-Chancellor was Professor Peter Dzvimbo.

Below is a table showing student enrolment in the Zimbabwe Open University from 1999 to 2017:

The year 2001 marked the increase of the enrollment figures to 23,161. It was because Commerce degrees were introduced that year. There was a decline in student enrollment in 2002 because some found independent learning difficult and many students faced economic difficulties. In 2003, a total of 19,228 students were enrolled in the university which constituted 46.9% of the total university enrolment in the country. According to 2006 estimates, approximately 20,000 students are enrolled in the university which makes it the largest university in Zimbabwe.

Vision and mission
According to the website of the university, ZOU's vision is the "VISION
To be the university of choice in open and distance learning

MISSION
Empowering the world through high quality open and distance learning enabled by technology 2018". The core ideology of the university is "to develop a best-practice enterprise-culture-based open and distance learning university focused on influencing development and change". ZOU's website states its mission is "to empower people through life long learning, thereby enabling them to realise their full potential in an affordable and flexible manner while executing their various endeavours".

Academics
The Zimbabwe Open University is a multidisciplinary and inter-faculty institution. It offers both degree courses and non-degree courses. The university has six faculties: the Faculty of Science and technology, the Faculty of Arts and Education, the Faculty of Commerce and Law, Faculty of Applied Social Sciences, Faculty Agriculture and Faculty of Information Technology. A total of 24 programmes are offered under these faculties. As of 2006;

The Faculty of Education:

Department of Educational Studies
Department of Teacher Development.

The Faculty of Science and Technology has four departments:

Department of Health Science,
Department of Mathematics and Statistics
Department of Geography and Environmental Studies.

The Faculty of Commerce is the largest faculty. It has three departments:

Department of Banking and Finance Management and Business Studies
Department of Accounting
Department of Human Resources, Marketing and Labour Relations.

The Faculty of Agriculture has three Department:

Department of Agricultural Management
Department of Animal Production - Work in Progress
Department of Soils and Plant Sciences - Work in Progress

Faculty of IT and Multimedia Communications has two departments:

Department of Information Technology
Department of Software Engineering

Faculty of Applied Social Sciences

Department of Counselling 	
Department of Development Studies 	
Department of Disability Studies 	
Department of Information Science and Records Management 	
Department of Peace
Department of Psychology

Faculty of Arts, Culture and Heritage Studies:

Department of Heritage Studies
Department of Languages and Literature
Department of Media and Journalism Studies
Department of Religious Studies and Philosophy

The course delivery methods include print media, compact cassettes, videocassettes, telephone, fax, e-mail, CDs and radio broadcasts. ZOU arranges for its students monthly face-to-face meetings with tutors in its regional centers. The university is envisaging the introduction of telelearning/teleteaching methods in its course delivery.

ZOU was a partner in the Electronic Distance Training on Sustainability in African Local Governments (EDITOSIA), a project started in 2001 aimed at formulating recommendations for policymakers of the government, training institutions, municipal associations and other agencies regarding promotion of teaching methods for building the capacity of African governments to deal with the challenges of local sustainability.

ZOU has partnered with the Foundation of Angel of Hope led by Zimbabwe `s First lady to give women a chance to improve their lives through offering free learning to Zimbabwe`s disadvantaged women. The programme is intended to cover all of Zimbabwe`s provinces to empower women in different life skills. The First lady, Mrs  Mnangagwa urged all women, young and old to go back to school in order to benefit their families and communities. The Vice Chancellor of ZOU, Professor Paul Gundani and his team embraced the programme and were ready to offer their guidance to the benefiting women.

Library
The library of the university was fundamental in the success of ZOU. The libraries consist of a branch in each of the regional centers handled by two people. These libraries are very popular. The administration of all the libraries in different regional centers are centralized to maintain uniformity and easy coordination. The library of ZOU has agreement with other universities in the country under the Zimbabwe University Libraries Associations to use each other's facilities.

Effects on the nation
According to Mr Mhlotswa, the Deputy Librarian of the Zimbabwe Open University, the course on agriculture offered by ZOU has contributed significantly to the land reform programme in the country. The industry also praised the university as many of their employees have improved performance after undergoing the ZOU programmes. Graduates from the ZOU are established in almost every sector of the economy of Zimbabwe.

Notable alumni 
 Rudolf Nyandoro, Catholic bishop

References

External links
Official Website
Distance education in Zimbabwe
Southern African University

Zimbabwe Open University
Educational institutions established in 1999
1999 establishments in Zimbabwe